The  was an electric multiple unit (EMU) train type operated by TRTA (present-day Tokyo Metro) on the then TRTA Hibiya Line from 1961 to 1994.

Operations

This train was fitted with safety systems compatible with the Tokyu Toyoko Line and Tobu Isesaki Line. This train was also compatible with driverless operation on the Hibiya Line section experimented starting from February 1962 by retrofitting car no. 3015 with autopilot equipment and was extended to the entire Hibiya Line by October 1970, with two additional cars, numbers 3057 and 3035 retrofitted with autopilot equipment in January and November 1963. The autopilot trials were stopped by 1987, and despite the autopilot equipment occupying a large space in these three cars these experiments subsequently became the basis of operating the Namboku Line in driverless mode. The 3000 series ran as full 8-car sets.

Formations

The first 3000 series trains were built as two-car sets, but the fleet was gradually lengthened to four-car, six-car, and finally eight-car formations, as shown below.

March 1961 -

May 1962 -

August 1964 -

May 1971 - 1994

The Mc cars had small driving cabs for use in depot shunting.

History

The 3000 series trains were gradually phased out from 1988 following the introduction of new 03 series EMUs. The last sets ran in revenue service on 22 July 1994, with a special "sayonara" run for rail enthusiasts on the following day using set 3055, specially decorated in a "whale" colour scheme and carrying a "Sayonara 3000 series" headboard.

Resale
Some trains were sold to the Nagano Electric Railway where they were operated as two-car and three-car sets reclassified as 3500 and 3600 series.

Pantographs and traction motors from withdrawn 3000 series cars were also reclaimed for use on Choshi Electric Railway 1000 series electric cars.

Preserved examples
Two cars, 3001 and 3002, were returned to Tokyo Metro's Ayase Depot in 2007 following their withdrawal from service on the Nagano Electric Railway. The two cars were moved to Senju Depot in 2015 where they are undergoing further renovation.

See also
 List of driverless trains

References

Electric multiple units of Japan
Train-related introductions in 1961
1500 V DC multiple units of Japan